Kościerzyna railway station is a railway station serving the town of Kościerzyna, in the Pomeranian Voivodeship, Poland. The station is located on the Nowa Wieś Wielka–Gdynia Port railway, Chojnice–Kościerzyna railway. The train services are operated by Przewozy Regionalne and SKM Tricity.

History
The first line built from Pszczółki in the period of 1884 - 1885 reached Kościerzyna in 1885. Five years later, a line from Kościerzyna to Lipusz and Bytów opened. In 1901 another line reached the station (from Kartuzy and in 1928, a part of the Coal Line.

The station also used to lie on the Kościerzyna–Gołubie Kaszubskie railway until its closure in 1930 and Pszczółki–Kościerzyna railway. The station used to be known as Berent (Westpreußen) under German occupation between 1885-1920 and 1939–1945.

Heritage museum
Kościerzyna is famous for its Skansen Parowozownia Kościerzyna railway museum, located near the station, exhibiting many examples of Polish locomotives.

Train services
The station is served by the following services:
Pomorska Kolej Metropolitalna services (R) Kościerzyna — Gdańsk Port Lotniczy (Airport) — Gdańsk Wrzeszcz — Gdynia Główna
Pomorska Kolej Metropolitalna services (R) Kościerzyna — Gdańsk Osowa — Gdynia Główna 
Regional services (R) Chojnice - Brusy - Lipusz - Koscierzyna

References

Kościerzyna article at Polish Stations Database, URL accessed at 6 March 2006
 This article is based upon a translation of the Polish language version as of July 2016.

External links

Articles on Skansen Museum (PL)
Photos of Skansen Museum
Steam Museum (PL)

Railway stations in Pomeranian Voivodeship
Kościerzyna County
Railway stations in Poland opened in 1885